Emily Jenkins (born September 13, 1967), who sometimes uses the pen name E. Lockhart, is an American writer of children's picture books, young-adult novels, and adult fiction. She is known best for the Ruby Oliver quartet (which begins with The Boyfriend List), The Disreputable History of Frankie Landau-Banks, and We Were Liars.

Personal life

Jenkins grew up in Cambridge, Massachusetts, and Seattle, Washington. In high school she attended summer drama schools at Northwestern University and the Children's Theatre Company in Minneapolis. She attended Lakeside School, a private high school in North Seattle. She went to Vassar College—where she studied illustrated books and interviewed Barry Moser for her senior thesis—and graduate school at Columbia University, where she earned a doctorate in English literature.

Writer 

Jenkins writes as E. Lockhart for the young adult market; "Lockhart" was the family name of her mother's mother. Her first book by Lockhart was a novel, The Boyfriend List, published by Random House Dell Delacorte Press in 2005. There are three sequels, The Boy Book (2006), The Treasure Map of Boys (2009), and Real Live Boyfriends (2010), and the four are also known collectively as the Ruby Oliver novels after their central protagonist. Another novel for teens, The Disreputable History of Frankie Landau-Banks (2008), was a finalist for both the National Book Award for Young People's Literature and the Michael L. Printz Award. We Were Liars made the shortlist of four books for the 2014 Guardian Children's Fiction Prize. The annual prize judged by British children's writers recognizes the year's best U.K.-published book by a writer who has not previously won it.

Under her real name Jenkins has collaborated with illustrators to produce children's books and picture books. They have received honors including the Oppenheim Toy Portfolio Platinum Book Award (the original Toys Go Out, illustrated by Paul O. Zelinsky) and two runners-up for Boston Globe–Horn Book Award (Five Creatures, illus. Tomek Bogacki, and That New Animal, illus. Pierre Pratt).

Works

Children's books by Emily Jenkins 
 The Secret Life of Billie's Uncle Myron, co-written with her father Len Jenkin (no 's') (Macmillan/Henry Holt BYR, 1996) – "a middle-grade fantasy adventure novel with lots of jokes" 
 Five Creatures, illustrated by Tomek Bogacki, (Farrar, Straus and Giroux/Frances Foster, 2001)
 My Favorite Thing (According to Alberta), illustrated by Anna Laura Cantone (Simon & Schuster/Anne Schwartz, 2004)
 Daffodil, illustrated by Tomek Bogacki (FSG/Frances Foster, 2004)
 That New Animal, illustrated by Pierre Pratt (FSG/FF, 2005)
 Daffodil, Crocodile, illustrated by Tomek Bogacki (FSG/FF, 2006)
 Love You When You Whine, illustrated by Sergio Ruzzier (FSG/FF, 2006)
 Toys Go Out: Being the Adventures of a Knowledgeable Stingray, a Toughy Little Buffalo, and Someone called Plastic, illustrated by Paul O. Zelinsky (Random House/Schwartz & Wade, 2006) – a book of stories
 Bea and Haha board books, illustrated by Tomek Bogacki (FSG/FF, 2006): 1. Num, num, num!; 2. Hug, hug, hug!; 3. Plonk, plonk, plonk!; 4. Up, up, up!
 What Happens on Wednesdays, illustrated by Lauren Castillo (FSG/FF, 2007)
 Skunkdog, illustrated by Pierre Pratt (FSG/Frances Foster, 2008)
 The Little Bit Scary People, illustrated by Alexandra Boiger (Hyperion BFC, 2008)
 Toy Dance Party: Being the Further Adventures of a Bossy-Boots Stingray, a Courageous Buffalo, and a Hopeful Round Someone called Plastic, illustrated by Paul O. Zelinsky (2008)
 Sugar Would Not Eat It, illustrated by Giselle Potter (Schwartz & Wade, 2009)
 Small Medium Large, illustrated by Tomek Bogacki (Cambridge, MA: Star Bright Books, 2011)
 Toys Come Home: Being the Early Experiences of an Intelligent Stingray, a Brave Buffalo, and a Brand-New Someone called Plastic, illustrated by Paul O. Zelinsky (Schwartz & Wade, 2011)
 Invisible Inkling, illustrated by Harry Bliss (HarperCollins/Balzer + Bray, 2011) – a novel
 Lemonade in Winter: A Book About Two Kids Counting Money, illustrated by G. Brian Karas (Schwartz & Wade, 2012)
 Dangerous Pumpkins, illustrated by Harry Bliss (HarperCollins/Balzer + Bray, 2012) – Invisible Inkling #2
 The Whoopie Pie War, illustrated by Harry Bliss (HarperCollins/Balzer + Bray, 2013) – Invisible Inkling #3
 Water in the Park, illustrated by Stephanie Graegin (Schwartz & Wade, 2013)
 A Fine Dessert, illustrated by Sophie Blackall (Schwartz & Wade, 2014)
 Princessland, illustrated by Barbara McClintock (FSG/FF, 2014)
 Toys Meet Snow: Being the Wintertime Adventures of a Curious Stuffed Buffalo, a Sensitive Plush Stingray, and a Book-Loving Rubber Ball, illustrated by Paul O. Zelinsky (Schwartz & Wade, 2015)
 The Fun Book of Scary Stuff illustrated by Hyewon Yum (FSG, 2015)
 Tiger and Badger, illustrated by Marie-Louise Gay (Candlewick, 2016)

Adult books by Emily Jenkins

 Tongue First: Adventures in Physical Culture (1998) – essays
 Mister Posterior and the Genius Child (Berkley Books, 2002) – a novel

Young-adult books by E. Lockhart 
Fly on the Wall: How One Girl Saw Everything (Delacorte BYR, 2006) – young-adult contemporary fantasy
Dramarama (Hyperion, 2007)
The Disreputable History of Frankie Landau-Banks (Hyperion, 2008)
Genuine Fraud (Delacorte, 2017)
Again Again (Delacorte, 2020)

Ruby Oliver series 

The Boyfriend List:15 Guys, 11 Shrink Appointments, 4 Ceramic Frogs, and Me, Ruby Oliver) (Random House/Delacorte Press, 2005) 
This novel has been suggested as a great novel to co-teach with The Scarlet Letter for high school students.  The Treasure Map of Boys: Noel, Jackson, Finn, Hutch, Gideon, and Me, Ruby Oliver (Delacorte, 2009)
Real Live Boyfriends: Yes, Boyfriends, Plural, if my Life weren't Complicated, I wouldn't be Ruby Oliver (2010) – Ruby Oliver #4 (senior year), the finale
The Boy Book: A Study of Habits and Behaviors, Plus Techniques for Taming Them (Delacorte, 2006)

Liars set 

 We Were Liars (Delacorte, 2014)
 Family of Liars (Delacorte, 2022)

As a co-author
How To Be Bad (HarperTeen, 2008), by Lockhart, Sarah Mlynowski, and Lauren Myracle
The Upside-Down Magic series (by Sarah Mlynowski, Lauren Myracle, and Emily Jenkins)
Upside-Down Magic
Sticks & Stones
Showing Off
Dragon Overnight
Weather or Not
The Big Shrink

Awards

References

External links
  (Emily Jenkins) with biographical essay
  (E. Lockhart) with biography
 The Boyfriend List (E. Lockhart blog)
 Toys FAQ
 The Reading Public and the Illustrated Novel, 1890-1914 (Columbia University, 1998) – Jenkins's dissertation for a PhD in 19th-century English literature
  (1996–present)
  (2005–present)

 

1967 births
Living people
American children's writers
American writers of young adult literature
Columbia Graduate School of Arts and Sciences alumni
Lakeside School alumni
Vassar College alumni
21st-century pseudonymous writers
Pseudonymous women writers